Wadi Shis is a wadi, a seasonal watercourse, in the Hajar Mountains of Sharjah, United Arab Emirates. The wadi passes through the mountain village of Shis, before making its way through the Omani exclave of Madha, the Emirati exclave of Nahwa (part of Sharjah), through Madha again and down to the east coast.

Like many of the wadis of the Hajar Mountains, Shis can be dangerous during and following periods of rain and in 2020 four UAE nationals lost their cars to flash flooding in the wadi. 

The village is the site of an integrated recreation facility, constructed to highlight the natural beauty of the area. It was opened in October 2020.

See also
List of wadis of the United Arab Emirates

References

Rivers of the United Arab Emirates
Geography of the Emirate of Sharjah